Mannophryne caquetio is a species of frog in the family Aromobatidae.
It is endemic to Venezuela.
Its natural habitats are subtropical or tropical moist lowland forest and rivers.
It is threatened by habitat loss.

References

caquetio
Amphibians described in 1999
Amphibians of Venezuela
Endemic fauna of Venezuela
Taxonomy articles created by Polbot